North Marion High School is a public high school in Aurora, Oregon, United States.  The school is part of the North Marion School District with all four schools being located on the same campus.  The school draws students from the cities of Aurora, Hubbard, and Donald as well as the communities of Broadacres and Butteville.

Academics
The school earned a 4 (out of 5) in its report card grading for the 2013-2014 school year, meaning more than 70 percent of students met or exceeded standards on the Oregon Assessment of Knowledge and Skills.  North Marion High School's completion rate was 94.8 percent, and its four-year graduation rate was 78.6 percent.

OAKS testing scores 

2013-2014 North Marion High School test scores:
Reading: 95.7% passed or exceeded   State Average: 85.6%
Writing: 74.8% passed or exceeded   State Average: 61.3%
Mathematics: 98.2% passed or exceeded   State Average: 71.3%
Science: 86.4% passed or exceeded   State Average: 61.3%

Athletics

The North Marion High School athletics teams compete in the OSAA 4A Tri-Valley Conference.  The school's athletic director is Ron Holyoake and athletic secretary is Anita Whitehead.

State Championships

Bob Brack Stadium
Bob Brack Stadium is the varsity baseball field located on the campus of North Marion High School, in the school's athletic complex.  In 2011, it was rated "best high school baseball facility on the West Coast" by the National High School Baseball Coaches Association.

Media coverage
In 2011, North Marion students Josh Hauser, Cole Costello, Wyatt Moore, and Logan Beiser founded North Marion Athletics, an organization which highlights scores, storylines, and successes in varsity sports at North Marion High School. Weekly update videos were produced and uploaded on YouTube, along with various interviews, promotional videos, and live broadcasts with commentary of key away games. NM Athletics remained operational until the graduation of the founders in June 2013.

The student-led production was highlighted in local newspapers such as the Woodburn Independent and a Portland Metropolitan Area News Station in Fox 12 KPTV.

Notable alumni
 Pat Chaffey, 1986, NFL runningback
 Kory Casto, 2000, MLB player
 Steve Schrenk, 1987, MLB player
 Tucker Knight, 2008, a professional wrestler for WWE

References 

Aurora, Oregon
High schools in Marion County, Oregon
Public high schools in Oregon